The Kumaon snowtrout (Schizothorax kumaonensis) is a species of ray-finned fish in the genus Schizothorax.

The Latin specific epithet kumaonensis refers to Kumaon (a former kingdom) in Uttarakhand, India.

References 

Schizothorax
Fish described in 1971